The greater petrosal nerve (or greater superficial petrosal nerve) is a nerve in the skull that branches from the facial nerve; it forms part of a chain of nerves that innervate the lacrimal gland. The preganglionic parasympathetic axons of this nerve synapse in the pterygopalatine ganglion.

Structure

Preganglionic parasympathetic fibres arise in the superior salivary nucleus of the pontine tegmentum.  They join with general somatic sensory and special sensory fibres to form the nervus intermedius. The nervus intermedius exits the cranial cavity at the internal auditory meatus, and joins with the motor root of the facial nerve at the geniculate ganglion. While preganglionic parasympathetic fibres pass through the geniculate ganglion, they neither synapse, nor have their cell bodies located there.

Preganglionic parasympathetic fibres exit the geniculate ganglion as the greater petrosal nerve. It enters the middle cranial fossa through the hiatus of the facial canal, along with the petrosal branch of the middle meningeal artery. It enters the pterygoid canal, where it joins the deep petrosal nerve (a sympathetic nerve) to form the nerve of the pterygoid canal, which passes through the pterygoid canal to reach the pterygopalatine ganglion.

Function
The greater petrosal nerve carries parasympathetic preganglionic fibers from the facial nerve. The greater petrosal nerve joins with the deep petrosal nerve (postganglionic sympathetic axons from the internal carotid plexus) and continues as the nerve of the pterygoid canal and ultimately synapses with the pterygopalatine ganglion whose parasympathetic postganglionic fibers synapse with the  lacrimal gland and the mucosal glands lining the nasal cavity and palate.

Additional images

External links
 
 University of Michigan Medical School "Dissector Answers - Ear and Nasal Cavity"

Facial nerve